Chantal Montellier, born on August 1, 1947, in Bouthéon near Saint-Étienne in the Loire Department, is a French comics creator and artist, editorial cartoonist, novelist, and painter. As the first female editorial cartoonist in France, she is noted for pioneering women's involvement in comic books.

Biography 
Chantal Montellier studied at the École Supérieure d'Art et Design Saint-Étienne from 1962 to 1969. From 1969 to 1973, she was a professor of visual arts in colleges and high schools. From 1989 to 1993, she taught courses at Paris 8 University. Starting in 1972, she worked as an editorial cartoonist for Combat syndicaliste, Politis, Maintenant, L'Humanité, L'Autre Journal, Marianne, France nouvelle, and Révolution, among others, at a time when she was the only woman exercising her talents in the male-dominated field of work. As a comics creator, she contributed notably at Charlie Mensuel, Métal Hurlant, (À suivre), and Psikopat.

Her realistic drawing, often in black and white early on, recalls that of Jacques Tardi, José Muñoz, or even Guido Crepax. She integrated many "modernist" graphic experiments (like ) before settling on her own profoundly original aesthetic.

Montellier began publishing comic strips such as Andy Gang in Charlie Mensuel in 1974 and in the French feminist comics magazine Ah! Nana in 1976. Her dystopian strip 1996, originally appearing in Métal Hurlant, was reprinted in Heavy Metal in the United States in the late 1970s, bringing her work to the notice of Anglophone readers.

Chantal Montellier is one of the rare comic strip creators to have affirmed (and continues to affirm) her political and feminist engagement. For example, in Les Damnés de Nanterre, an investigative comic strip about Florence Rey, she takes apart the official version of the shootout at the Place de la Nation, which set the police against an anarchist group. She came to suffer consequences for it: when she was first invited to Lausanne, for the 2007 , her appearance was canceled on the pretext that her presence might bother the other authors there.

Among her projects is her personal web site where, since 2007, her autobiographical account De l'art et des cochons (Of Art and Pigs) prominently features her comics universe (its actresses and actors, publishers, etc.) and an album of comics that she describes, inside quotation marks, as "erotic."

In 2017, she brought out a new, completely revised edition of Shelter Market published by Les Impressions Nouvelles and a novel inspired by her own life, Les vies et les morts de Cléo Stirner, in the literature collection of Éditions Goater.

Political engagement
In 2012, Montellier supported Jean-Luc Mélenchon, the Left Party candidate in the presidential election.

Publications

Comic strips and graphic novels
 1996, Les Humanoïdes Associés, 1978
 Les Rêves du fou, Futuropolis, 1978
 Blues, Kesselring, 1979
 Andy Gang :
 Andy Gang, Les Humanoïdes Associés, 1979
 Andy Gang et le tueur de la Marne, Les Humanoïdes Associés, 1980
 Joyeux Noël pour Andy Gang, Les Humanoïdes Associés, 1980
 Shelter, Les Humanoïdes Associés, 1980
 Lectures, Les Humanoïdes Associés, 1981
 Le Sang de la commune, Futuropolis, 1982
 Wonder city, Les Humanoïdes Associés, 1982
 La Toilette, storyline by Pierre Charras, Futuropolis, 1983
 Odile et les crocodiles, Les Humanoïdes Associés, 1983; reprint retouched by Acte Sud/L'An II in 2008
 L'esclavage c'est la liberté, Les Humanoïdes Associés, 1984
 Rupture, Les Humanoïdes Associés, 1985
 Un deuil blanc, Futuropolis, 1987
 Julie Bristol :
 La Fosse aux serpents, Casterman, 1990
 Faux sanglant, Dargaud, 1992
 L'Île aux démons, Dargaud, 1994
 Voyages au bout de la crise, Dargaud, 1995
 Sa majesté la mouche, in Noire est la terre, collective, Autrement, 1996
 La Femme aux loups, Z'éditions, 1998
 Paris sur sang, Mystère au Père Lachaise, Dargaud, 1998
 Social Fiction, Vertige Graphic, 2003, compilation of the albums 1996, Wonder City, and Shelter; foreword by Jean-Pierre Dionnet
 Les Damnés de Nanterre, Denoël Graphic, 2005
 Sorcières mes sœurs, La Boîte à bulles, 2006 
 Tchernobyl mon amour, Actes Sud, 2006
 The Trial, after Kafka, storyline by David Zane Mairowitz, Actes Sud, 2009
 L'Inscription, Actes Sud, 2011
 Shelter Market, new enlarged version of the album Shelter originally published in 1980, Les Impressions Nouvelles, 2017

Editorial cartooning
 Impressions sur "Betty" dans la "Force des sentiments", L'Autre Journal, March 26 to April 2, 1986
 Sous pression, Pop'com/Graphein, 2001

Novels
 Voyages au bout de la crise, Dargaud, 1995, illustrated novel
 La Dingue aux marrons, Baleine, 1997 (Le Poulpe)
 TGV, conversations ferroviaires, stories, Les Impressions Nouvelles, 2005
 Les Vies et les morts de Cléo Stirner, novel, Éditions Goater, 2017

See also

 Franco-Belgian comics
 Women comics creators

References

Bibliography
 Patrick Gaumer, "Montellier, Chantal", in Dictionnaire mondial de la BD (Paris: Larousse, 2010) , p. 606–607.
 Yves Lacroix (ed.), I am a camera: Chantal Montellier, auteur de bandes dessinées, CASB, 1993.

External links
 Official site

French comics artists
French female comics artists
Female comics writers
French comics writers
French feminist writers
French women novelists
Feminist artists
French editorial cartoonists
French women cartoonists
Art educators
People from Loire (department)
1947 births
Living people